Morchella laurentiana is a species of fungus in the family Morchellaceae described as new to science in 2016. It is known only from the Saint Lawrence River basin in the Canadian province of Newfoundland and Labrador. It is in the Morchella elata clade.

References

External links

laurentiana
Edible fungi
Fungi described in 2016
Fungi of Canada
Fungi without expected TNC conservation status